The 2019 La Drôme Classic was the 6th edition of the La Drôme Classic cycle race. It was held on 3 March 2019 as a category 1.1 race on the 2019 UCI Europe Tour. The race started and finished in Livron-sur-Drôme.

Teams
Nineteen teams of up to seven riders were invited to the race. Of these teams, two were UCI WorldTour teams, sixteen were UCI Professional Continental teams, and one was a UCI Continental team. 102 of the 128 riders finished the race.

UCI WorldTeams

 
 

UCI Professional Continental Teams

 
 
 
 
 
 
 
 
 
 
 
 
 
 
 
 

UCI Continental Teams

Result

References

2019 in French sport
2019 UCI Europe Tour
La Drôme Classic
March 2019 sports events in France